Georgi Krumov Dakov (21 October 1967 – 29 July 1996) was a Bulgarian high jumper.

This is the Bulgarian record. Dakov reached the 1992 Olympic final and was the 1990 European Championship bronze medallist. He was born in Pleven. He died in a car crash on 29 July 1996.

He was a five-time Bulgarian National Champion (1986, 87, 88, 90 & 91)

International competitions
Note: Results with a "q", indicate overall position in qualifying round.

References

1967 births
1996 deaths
Bulgarian male high jumpers
Olympic athletes of Bulgaria
Athletes (track and field) at the 1992 Summer Olympics
World Athletics Championships athletes for Bulgaria
European Athletics Championships medalists
Sportspeople from Pleven
Road incident deaths in Bulgaria